Saša Stanišić (born 7 March 1978) is a Bosnian-German writer. He was born in Višegrad, Bosnia and Herzegovina as the son of a Bosniak mother and a Serbian father. In the spring of 1992, he fled alongside his family to Germany as a refugee of the Bosnian War. Stanišić spent the remainder of his youth in Heidelberg, where his teachers encouraged his passion for writing. After graduating from high school, he enrolled in the University of Heidelberg, graduating with degrees in Slavic studies and German as a second language.

In 2006, Stanišić released his debut novel, published in English as How the Soldier Repairs the Gramophone. The book won multiple awards both in Germany and abroad and has been translated into 31 languages as of 2019. The English translation by Anthea Bell was awarded the Oxford-Weidenfeld Translation Prize. It was also adapted for the stage by the Stadtschauspielhaus Graz, where Stanišić was the city's writer-in-residence in 2006–2007.

In 2019 he won the German Book Prize for his novel Herkunft (English title: Where You Come From). In his acceptance speech Stanišić expressed his discontent with the decision of the Nobel Committee to award the 2019 Literature Nobel Prize to the Austrian author Peter Handke. Stanišić criticized Handke for his support of Slobodan Milošević, saying, "I had the fortune to escape that which Peter Handke does not describe in his texts."

Bibliography

English translation

Awards and honors
 2013 Alfred Döblin Prize
 2019 German Book Prize for Herkunft (Where you come from)
 2021 Schiller Prize of the City of Marbach

References

External links

1978 births
Living people
People from Višegrad
Bosnia and Herzegovina refugees
Bosnia and Herzegovina expatriates in Germany
Bosnia and Herzegovina writers
German male writers
Yugoslav Wars refugees
International Writing Program alumni